Skokie may refer to

Skokie, Illinois, a village in Cook County, Illinois
National Socialist Party of America v. Village of Skokie
Skokie (film), a movie about the NSPA Controversy in Skokie
Skokie (rocket), a parachute test rocket used by the U.S. Air Force
Skokie Lagoons, a nature preserve in Cook County, Illinois